The Berlin Open was a men's tennis tournament played in Berlin, West Germany that was held five times between 1973 and 1979. The event was part of the Grand Prix circuit and was played on outdoor clay courts.

Finals

Singles

Doubles

See also
 European Indoor Championships - men's tournament held in Berlin (1990–1991)
 German Pro Championships  - men's professional tournament held in Berlin (1911–1952)

External links
 ATP 1973 Berlin Open
 ATP 1976 Berlin Open

Grand Prix tennis circuit
Defunct tennis tournaments in Germany
Clay court tennis tournaments
Sports competitions in Berlin 
Berlin Open